"Mary" was the third and final single from the Britpop band Supergrass' eponymous third album. Released in November 1999, it reached number 36 on the UK Singles Chart. This was the last Supergrass single to be released on cassette.

Chord progression and lead guitar breaks

Mary is written in the key of Cm.  The verses and chorus both employ the same chord progression of G♯-F-Cm, with guitarist Gaz Coombes utilising single string lead breaks on the 5th (A) string with an E-bow.  It is worth noting that the opening chord progression of the song bears some similarities to Carl Orff's Carmina Burana.

Track listing

CD1 CDRS6531 / TC TCR6531
 "Mary" (4:02)
 "Pumping on Your Stereo (Live at Peel Acres)" (3:12)
 "Strange Ones (Live at Peel Acres)" (3:57)

CD2 CDR6531
 "Mary (Live at Lamacq)" (4:12)
 "Richard III (Live at Peel Acres)" (3:29)
 "Sun Hits the Sky (Live at Peel Acres)" (4:44)

LTD. ED. Silver 7" R6531
 "Mary" (4:02)
 "Mary (Live at Lamacq)" (4:12)

Album Artwork
Photography: Nick Veasey

The single features a photo of a stone angel statue at night, whilst the 2nd CD of the CD release shows a similarly crafted stone statue of a man in daylight.

Music video
Conceived as an homage to the Hammer Horror films from the 1950s, the accompanying music video features three moderately scary scenes, always corresponding to the song's "falsetto screaming" chorus: a room with books flying off the shelves and objects exploding because of poltergeist, a housewife vomiting blood in front of her family (including two children) and a girl drowning in a bathtub while blood spouts from the sink. The video was banned from television due to being "too frightening".  An edited version was released, replacing the aforementioned scary scenes with pictures of onions.

References

1999 singles
1999 songs
Music videos directed by Sophie Muller
Parlophone singles
Songs written by Rob Coombes
Supergrass songs